John Neill may refer to:

John Neill (archbishop of Dublin) (born 1945), Archbishop of Dublin and Bishop of Glendalough
John Neill (footballer) (born 1987), Scottish footballer
John R. Neill (1877–1943), American children's book illustrator
John W. Neill (1934–2019), British field hockey player

See also
John Baldwin Neil (1842–1902), governor of Idaho Territory
John Neal (disambiguation)
John Neale (disambiguation)